Four Gateway Center is a 305 ft (93 m) skyscraper in Pittsburgh, Pennsylvania. It was completed in 1960 at a cost of $16 million ($ in  dollars) and opened on June 24 of that year. It is the 26th tallest building in Pittsburgh and has 22 floors. Virtually all materials used to construct the tower were products of Pennsylvania factories and mills.

See also
List of tallest buildings in Pittsburgh

References

External links

Official Site
Emporis
Glass Steel and Stone

Residential buildings in Pittsburgh
Skyscraper office buildings in Pittsburgh

Office buildings completed in 1960
Harrison & Abramovitz buildings
1960 establishments in Pennsylvania